Undasa Madhopur railway station is a small railway station in Dewas district, Madhya Pradesh. Its code is UDM.

Background
It serves Undasa Madhopur village. The station consists of a single platform.

References

External links

Railway stations in Dewas district
Ratlam railway division